Sati Savitri is a 1978 Telugu-language Hindu mythological film directed by B. A. Subba Rao. It stars N. T. Rama Rao, Krishnam Raju and Vanisri  with music composed by Ghantasala and Pendyala Nageswara Rao. It is produced by A. Sankar Reddy under the Lalitha Siva Jyothi Studios. The film is based on the story of Savitri and Satyavan.

Plot
Savitri (Vanisri), the only daughter of Aswapathi Maharaja (Gummadi), King of Madra has married Satyavantha (Krishnam Raju), son of blind King Dyumatsena Maharaja (Dhulipala), who lived in exile as a forest-dweller. Knowing well that Satyavantha has only a year of lifespan, after the marriage, she marries him. On his death day when Satyavantha is cutting wood, he suddenly gets dizzy and lays his head in Savitri's lap. Yama Dharma Raju (N. T. Rama Rao) himself descends onto the earth and claims his soul. Savitri follows when Yama Dharma Raju tries to convince her to go back, she persists. Impressed with her persuasive speech, he grants her three boons; anything except bringing back her husband's life. The first one, she asks him to restore her in-law's' eyesight and kingdom, then a son for her parents and finally a son for herself by mistake Yama Dharma Raja grants the three. Here the last wish creates an awkward situation as it is impossible to have a child without a husband. Finally, Yama Dharma Raju accepts his defeat, returns Satyavantha's life to Savitri and blesses the couple.

Cast

N. T. Rama Rao as Yama Dharma Raju
Krishnam Raju as Satyavanta
Vanisri as Savitri
Kanta Rao as Narada Maharshi
Gummadi as Aswapathi Maharaju
Mikkilineni as Lord Brahma
Dhulipala as Dyumatsena Maharaju 
Prabhakar Reddy as Rudrasena Maharaju 
Allu Ramalingaiah as Chitra Gupta 
Raja Babu as Sharadudu
K.V.Chalam as Astrologer 
P. J. Sarma as Lord Siva
Nagaraju as  Lord Vishnu
Jamuna as Vijaya
K. R. Vijaya as Adi Parashakti
Anjali Devi as Aswapathi Maharaju's wife 
Pandari Bai as Dyumatsena Maharaju's wife
Rama Prabha as Chitra 
Madhavi as Chandra Prabha
Mamata as Goddess Saraswati
Halam as Dancer 
Jaya Malini as Dancer 
Pushpa Kumari

Music 

Music was composed by Ghantasala and Pendyala. Music released by EMI Columbia Audio Company.

References

External links

1978 films
1970s Telugu-language films
Films about Savitri and Satyavan
Indian fantasy films
1970s fantasy films
Films scored by Ghantasala (musician)
Films scored by Pendyala Nageswara Rao
Films based on Indian folklore
Films based on the Mahabharata
Films directed by B. A. Subba Rao